Jano Köhler (sometimes spelled Jano Koehler; 9 February 1873 – 20 January 1941) was a Czech painter. He is known for decorating sacral buildings with frescoes and sgraffiti.

Life and education
Köhler was born in a Czech-German family, but his German father died soon after. He showed interest in fine arts and went to study in Prague. He graduated from Academy of Arts, Architecture and Design (1893–1897) and Academy of Fine Arts (1897–1900). During his studies, he gained valuable experience in the field of monumental painting, especially in the field of frescoes and sgraffiti.

He was student of Kamil Hilbert, Stanislav Sucharda, Felix Jenewein, Otakar Hostinský, František Ženíšek and Maximilian Pirner.

In 1899, he bought a house in Nenkovice where he set up a studio, and moved here in 1901. From 1926 until his death he lived in Strážovice. He died in a hospital in Brno in 1941 and was buried in Strážovice.

Work
Köhler was active mostly in Moravia, but he travelled to work all over the country. He created most of his works in Prostějov, where he received his first contract in 1900 to decorate Prostějov Castle. During his career he decorated 40 churches and 35 secular buildings. His work counts a total of 2,500 works, mostly with a religious focus. He created his own distinctive ornament, drawn from the sources of Moravian folk art.

Köhler specialized in frescoes and sgraffiti, but he also worked with the ceramic mosaic technique. During his life he created or designed 40 mosaic works, including decoration of 11 Stations of the Cross on the pilgrimage Hostýn hill.

During the winter months, when work on the buildings was not possible, he devoted himself to designs for the warmer months, and occasionally dealt with watercolors, oil paintings, drawings, illustrations and graphics.

His notable works include:
In Olomouc Region
Prostějov: Prostějov Castle – frescoes and sgraffiti; Church of the Exaltation of the Holy Cross – frescoes
Olomouc: Archbishop's Palace – fresco and sgraffiti; Chapel of Saint Jan Sarkander – frescoes
Litovel: Gymnasium of Jan Opletal – design of ceramic mosaics with scenes from the history of the town
Příkazy: Chapel of Saints Cyril and Methodius – decoration of interiors 
In Zlín Region
Luhačovice: Jurkovič House – fresco of Saints Cyril and Methodius; Augustiniánský dům Hotel – frescoes
Uherské Hradiště: Moravian Slovakia Museum – mosaic allegory of the seasons
Napajedla: town hall – ceramic mosaic; Church of Saint Bartholomew – decoration of interiors
Uherský Ostroh: bell tower – sgraffiti
Bystřice pod Hostýnem: Church of Saint Giles – frescoes
Chvalčov: 11 Stations of the Cross on the Hostýn hill – ceramic mosaic
In South Moravian Region
Kyjov: Church of the Assumption of the Virgin Mary – sgraffiti; Kyjov Castle – sgraffiti
Tišnov: Town hall – sgraffiti
Blatnice pod Svatým Antonínkem: Chapel of Saint Anthony of Padua – two murals
Oslnovice: Chapel of the Sacred Heart – decoration of interiors
In other Czech regions
Štramberk: Church of Saint John of Nepomuk – decoration of interiors
Semily: Obecní dům – ceramic mosaic

Awards
In 1928, Köhler was awarded Pro Ecclesia et Pontifice decoration by the pope for the lithography of Saints Cyril and Methodius in Prostějov, which also appeared on postage stamps.

Legacy
Streets in Prostějov-Vrahovice and in Kyjov were named after him. There is a permanent museum exhibition about his life and work in Nenkovice.

A documentary film about work of Jano Köhler was filmed in 2016.

Gallery

References

1873 births
1941 deaths
Artists from Brno
People from the Margraviate of Moravia
Czech male painters
20th-century Czech painters
19th-century Czech people
20th-century Czech people
Czech people of German descent
20th-century Czech male artists
Academy of Arts, Architecture and Design in Prague alumni
Austro-Hungarian painters